Joe McDaniel Field at Farris Stadium was a multi-purpose stadium in Danville, Kentucky. It was the home of the Centre Colonels football, field hockey, lacrosse, and track teams, in addition to various intramural teams.

The stadium was built in 1923 and dedicated on November 3 of that year. The stadium's first game saw Centre defeat Kentucky, 10–0, in front of 15,000 fans.

The stadium's namesake is Morris Farris Jr., a 1915 graduate of the college. Upon his death in 1934, he left $25,000 to the college for the improvement of the playing surface and stadium with the provision that the name "Farris Stadium" be adopted.

The field was re-surfaced with synthetic turf in the summer of 2009, though this process was significantly delayed due to poor weather.

References

Sports venues in Kentucky
Multi-purpose stadiums in the United States
Centre College
1923 establishments in Kentucky
Sports venues completed in 1923
American football venues in Kentucky
College football venues
College field hockey venues in the United States
College lacrosse venues in the United States
College track and field venues in the United States
Athletics (track and field) venues in Kentucky